The U.S. Open Cup is an American soccer competition open to all United States Soccer Federation affiliated teams, from amateur adult club teams to the professional clubs of Major League Soccer, the country's top-flight league. The tournament was first contested in 1913–14 and continued uninterrupted until a two-year pause in 2020 and 2021 due to the COVID-19 pandemic. It is the oldest still-running annual sports tournament in the United States.

With five titles each, Bethlehem Steel of Bethlehem, Pennsylvania and Maccabee Los Angeles have won the domestic cup more times than any other American soccer club. In a joint tie for third, the Chicago Fire, Fall River Marksmen, Greek American Atlas, Philadelphia Ukrainians, Seattle Sounders FC, and Sporting Kansas City have won the title four times.

In the cup's 105-year history, 63 different clubs have won the tournament. , teams from 18 states have won the U.S> Open Cup. The winner qualifies for a berth in the CONCACAF Champions League, the premier club competition for North America, Central America, and the Caribbean.

History 

The competition dates back to 1914, when it was known as the National Challenge Cup. Prior to the National was the American Football Association's American Cup. Due to internal conflicts within the AFA regarding the process of allowing teams to enter, a new association called the American Amateur Football Association was created. Formed in October 1911, the association quickly spread outside of the Northeast and created its own cup in 1912, the American Amateur Football Association Cup. That year, both the AFA and AAFA applied for membership in FIFA, the international governing body for soccer. In 1913, the AAFA gained an edge over the AFA when several AFA organizations moved to the AAFA. On April 5, 1913, the AAFA reorganized as the United States Football Association, presently known as the United States Soccer Federation. FIFA quickly granted a provisional membership, and USFA began exerting its influence on the sport. This influence led to the establishment of the National Challenge Cup that fall. The National Challenge Cup quickly grew to overshadow the American Cup. However, both cups were played simultaneously for the next ten years. Declining respect for the AFA led to the withdrawal of several associations from its cup in 1917. Further competition came in 1924 when USFA created the National Amateur Cup. That move spelled the death knell for the American Cup. It played its last season in 1924.

MLS era
The U.S. Open Cup has been dominated by MLS teams since that league began play in 1996. The last non-MLS team to win the cup were the Rochester Rhinos in 1999. The last non-MLS team to reach the final was the Sacramento Republic FC in 2022.
In 1999, the U.S. Soccer Federation honored one of American soccer's most important patrons, Lamar Hunt, by changing the official title of the tournament to the Lamar Hunt U.S. Open Cup. The winners of the tournament were awarded the Dewar Cup, donated by Sir Thomas Dewar for the promotion of soccer in America in 1912, until it was retired for its poor condition in 1979. It was brought back into use by the United States Adult Soccer Association in 1997, but went back on permanent display at the now closed National Soccer Hall of Fame in Oneonta, New York, and the recent winners of the tournament have been awarded a new, different trophy.

Key

Results

Teams with multiple wins 
Teams shown in italics are no longer in existence.

Notes

See also 
 History of the U.S. Open Cup
 U.S. Open Cup
 List of American and Canadian soccer champions
 List of U.S. Open Cup winning head coaches

References

External links 

 
U.S. Open Cup